Rully Desrian (born in Padang, Indonesia, 19 December 1996) is an Indonesian professional footballer who plays as a goalkeeper for Liga 2 club Perserang Serang. He was the part of Indonesia U19 that won 2013 AFF U-19 Youth Championship.

Career

Semen Padang
He started his football career at Semen Padang, when he played mostly for Semen Padang FC U-21, with which he won the 2014 Indonesia Super League U-21. His good performances made him earn a spot in Indonesia U-19.

Bali United
In 2016, he joined Bali United to play in ISC A, Indonesian first-tier league at that time. He played in several big matches, i.e.: Semen Padang vs Bali United, in which he saved a penalty kick, PSM Makasar vs Bali United, and Bali United vs Persela. He made a clean sheet when Bali United played an away game with Madura United. However, he made a fatal mistake when Bali United draw 1-1 to Gresik United on August 1, 2016, which made manager Indra Sjafri lost his temper.

Bhayangkara F.C.
In 2017, he joined Bhayangkara F.C. to compete in 2017 Liga 1, and played in 4 matches. With Bhayangkara F.C., he won Liga 1 this season.

Aceh United
For 2018 season, he signed for newly-promoted club Aceh United to compete in 2018 Liga 2. Until May 31, 2018, he has played in all Aceh United league games, and conceded 9 goals in 5 games.

International career

He was the part of Indonesia U-17 and Indonesia U-19. With Indonesia U-17, he won HKFA International Youth Football Invitation Tournament 2012 and HKJC Cup 2013, both held in Hongkong.

With Indonesia U-19, he won 2013 AFF U-19 Youth Championship where he played in the semifinal game when Indonesia U-19 defeated Timor-Leste U-19 2-0, in which he came from the bench substituting injured Ravi Murdianto in minute 37. He was also called for 2014 AFC U-19 Championship. In this tournament, he played in the first Indonesia U-19 game losing 1-3 to Uzbekistan U-19. But he did not play for the next two games when Indonesia U-19 played Australia U-19 and UAE U-19.

Personal life
Beside being a football player, he is also a member of Indonesian National Police.

Honours

Club
Semen Padang U21
 Indonesia Super League U-21: 2014
Bhayangkara
 Liga 1: 2017

International 
Indonesia U-16
 HKFA International Youth Invitation: 2012
Indonesia U-19
 HKFA International Youth Invitation: 2013
 AFF U-19 Youth Championship: 2013

References

External links
 

Living people
Indonesian footballers
Liga 2 (Indonesia) players
Bali United F.C. players
1996 births
Association football goalkeepers
People from Padang
Sportspeople from West Sumatra